Attilly is a commune in the department of Aisne in the Hauts-de-France region of northern France.

Geography
Attilly is located 5 km west of Saint-Quentin just north of the A29 autoroute which passes through the southwestern corner of the commune. It can be accessed by several roads: the D73 from Beauvois-en-Vermandois in the southwest to Villeveque, the D733 from Etreillers in the south going northwest to Villeveque, the D33 going north from Etreillers to Attilly village and continuing north to Marteville and Vermand, the D73 from the D1029 in the north to Marteville, and the D686 from Holnon in the east to the village. There are three villages and hamlets in the commune:
 Attilly in the centre with the town hall, the school (closed), the festival hall, the church, the train station (closed), 25 cafes (all closed), and a water tower
 Marteville in the north with its cemetery, railway station (closed), castle (private) is located next to the village of Vermand
 Villeveque in the west with the villa of the Prince of Monaco, ponds for fishing, and the mill (where it is possible to learn to swim)

Much of the commune is farmland; however, it is partly surrounded by the Forests of Holnon and Attilly.

The Omignon river passes along and forms the northwestern border of the commune through Marteville and Villevèque.

Neighbouring communes and villages

History
The name Attilly is derived from a word translated as "overlooking the water" and probably owes its name to its position atop a hill. The origin of the name Attilly therefore probably dates back to a Roman villa. However, the region has been inhabited for much longer.

Charles Poette wrote a history at the beginning of the 20th century. The village was destroyed during the First World War: only a single wall was still standing at the end of the conflict on the Rue du Prozet.

Administration

List of Successive Mayors of Attilly

Population

Sites and Monuments

 The Church of Saint Martin
 The War memorial commemorating the First World War.
 Marteville Communal Cemetery, a British military cemetery managed by the Commonwealth War Graves Commission.
 A Calvary on the road between Attilly and Marteville (Vermand), another between Attilly and Holnon, and another on the road to Etreillers. There is also one at the entrance to the village from the Attilly forest which is located facing the road to Vermand not far from the church
 A Calvary or Wayside Cross on the dirt road towards Etreillers after the water tower at the top of the village.
 A Tomb on the road to Etreillers
 The Place Verte (Green Square) located on the old Roman road between Holnon and Vermand
 The ruins of a Chapel in the middle of Attilly forest where there was an old village abandoned after the First World War
 The Place du Sar (Royal Square) where 14 July is celebrated and where the hall is built
 A Dovecote''' next to the Rue de l'Eglise.

Picture Gallery

Culture
The language spoken in Attilly is still a Picard dialect.

See also
 Communes of the Aisne department

References

External links
 Attilly on Géoportail, National Geographic Institute (IGN) website 
 Attilly on the 1750 Cassini Map

Communes of Aisne